Amanita muscaria var. guessowii, commonly known as the American yellow fly agaric,  is a basidiomycete fungus of the genus Amanita. It is one of several varieties of the Amanita muscaria fungi, all commonly known as fly agarics or fly amanitas.

Description

Cap
The cap is 4.5–16 (18) cm wide, convex,  and becomes broadly convex to flat in age. It is bright yellow or yellow-orange, usually more orange or reddish orange towards the disc, and fading to pale yellow. The volva is distributed over the cap as cream to pale tan warts; it is otherwise smooth and sticky when wet. The margin becomes slightly striate in age. The flesh is white and it does not stain when cut or injured.

Gills
The gills are free to narrowly adnate, subcrowded to crowded, cream to pale cream, truncate, unevenly distributed, of diverse lengths, and plentiful.

Spores
Amanita muscaria var. guessowii spores are white in deposit, broadly ellipsoid to ellipsoid (infrequently subglobose or elongate) and inamyloid. The spores are (7.0–) 8.7-12.2 (-14.8) x (5.9) 6.5–8.2 (9.5) µm.

Stipe
The stipe is 1–3 cm, more or less equal or narrowing upwards and slightly flaring at the apex. It is white to yellowish cream, densely stuffed with a pith, the skirt-like ring is membranous, persistent, the lower stipe and upper bulb are decorated with partial or complete concentric rings of volval material that are bright pale yellow to cream or sordid cream.

Microscopic features
Clamps are present at bases of the basidia.

Distribution and habitat
Amanita muscaria var. guessowii is found growing solitary or gregariously, it is mycorrhizal with conifers mostly but also deciduous trees as well, it is found often in the fall but sometimes in the spring, common in the northeast, from eastern Canada to North Carolina, northwest Florida, and west to Michigan.

Biochemistry

As with other Amanita muscaria, the guessowii variety contains ibotenic acid, and muscimol, two psychoactive constituents which can cause effects such as hallucinations, synaesthesia, euphoria, dysphoria and retrograde amnesia. The effects of muscimol and ibotenic acid most closely resemble that of any GABAERGIC compound but with a dissociative effect taking place in low to mid doses which are followed by delirium and vivid hallucinations at high doses. 

Ibotenic acid is mostly broken down into the body to muscimol, but what remains of the ibotenic acid is believed to cause the majority of dysphoric effects of consuming A. muscaria mushrooms. Ibotenic acid is also a scientifically important neurotoxin used in lab research as a brain-lesioning agent in mice.

As with other wild-growing mushrooms, the ratio of ibotenic acid to muscimol depends on countless external factors, including: season, age, and habitat - and percentages will naturally vary from mushroom-to-mushroom.

Gallery

See also 
 Amanita muscaria var. formosa

References

External links
http://www.amanitaceae.org/?Amanita+muscaria+var.+guessowii

muscaria var. guessowii
Fungi described in 1933
Fungi of North America